332P/Ikeya–Murakami (P/2010 V1) is a short-period comet with period of approximately 5.4 years first identified independently by the two Japanese amateur astronomers Kaoru Ikeya and Shigeki Murakami on November 3, 2010. Ikeya identified the comet using a 25-centimeter (10-inch) reflector at 39×, while Murakami used a 46 cm (18-inch) reflector at 78×. Photographic confirmation of the comet was obtained by Ernesto Guido and Giovanni Sostero using a Global-Rent-a-Scope (GRAS) telescope in New Mexico. Both Ikeya and Murakami discovered the comet using manual observation through optical telescopes. Such visual discoveries have become rare in recent years.

At the start of November 2010, a few weeks past perihelion passage, it was discovered the comet had undergone a major outburst between October 31 and November 3. After the 2010 perihelion passage, the comet only had about an 80-day observation arc.

The recovery of P/2010 V1 on December 31, 2015, at magnitude 20 was announced on January 2, 2016, and designated as P/2015 Y2. A secondary fragment (B) was confirmed and announced on January 5, 2016. The comet is now composed of component A and B with two different comas, envelopes and tails. Around January 11, 2016, two fainter potential fragments, designated P/2010 V1-C and P/2010 V1-D have been located, both likely having been fragmented from P/2010 V1-B. As of January 29, fragments B and D had nearly entirely disintegrated, and fragment C had undergone an outburst, making it as bright as P/2010 V1-A.

Even fragment A has not been observed since May 2016 and only has a 124 day observation arc.

References

External links 
 P 2010 V1 IKEYA-MURAKAMI
 332P/Ikeya-Murakami – Seiichi Yoshida @ aerith.net

Periodic comets
0332
Split comets
Comets in 2016
2010 in science
20101103